Felix Martin (February 26, 1899 – August 1969) was an American Negro league pitcher in the 1920s.

A native of San Augustine, Texas, Martin played for the Dayton Marcos in 1926. In five recorded games on the mound, he posted an 8.82 ERA over 16.1 innings. Martin died in Evanston, Illinois in 1969 at age 70.

References

External links
 and Seamheads

1899 births
1969 deaths
Date of death missing
Dayton Marcos players
Baseball pitchers
Baseball players from Texas
People from San Augustine, Texas
20th-century African-American sportspeople